Ibrahim Babangida (born 1 August 1976) is a Nigerian former professional footballer who played as a midfielder.

Career
Babangida was born in Kaduna. He played for Katsina United, Stationery Stores F.C. and Bank of the North in his home country and for Dutch club. FC Volendam. He played the right wing position.

International career
He represented the Nigeria national under-17 football team at the 1993 FIFA U-17 World Championship in Japan and was the World Champion.

Personal life
He is the brother of ex-Ajax Amsterdam winger Tijani Babangida and former Olympiacos forward Haruna Babangida.

References

1976 births
Living people
Sportspeople from Kaduna
Association football midfielders
Nigerian footballers
Nigerian expatriate footballers
Eredivisie players
Eerste Divisie players
Katsina United F.C. players
FC Volendam players
Babangida brothers